Ocoa Point is a steep headland backed by raised beach terraces at the head of New Plymouth harbour in Byers Peninsula, Livingston Island in the South Shetland Islands, Antarctica.  The area was visited by 19th century sealers.

The feature is part of the Antarctic Specially Protected Area ASPA 126 Byers Peninsula, situated in one of its restricted zones.

The feature was named in 1971 by the Chilean Antarctic Expedition geologists who had worked in the area, probably after a member of the expedition.

Location

Maps
 Península Byers, Isla Livingston. Mapa topográfico a escala 1:25000. Madrid: Servicio Geográfico del Ejército, 1992.
 L.L. Ivanov et al. Antarctica: Livingston Island and Greenwich Island, South Shetland Islands. Scale 1:100000 topographic map. Sofia: Antarctic Place-names Commission of Bulgaria, 2005.
 L.L. Ivanov. Antarctica: Livingston Island and Greenwich, Robert, Snow and Smith Islands. Scale 1:120000 topographic map.  Troyan: Manfred Wörner Foundation, 2009.

Notes

References
 SCAR Composite Antarctic Gazetteer.

Headlands of Livingston Island